The 1993 Cork Senior Hurling Championship was the 105th staging of the Cork Senior Hurling Championship since its establishment by the Cork County Board in 1887. The draw for the opening fixtures took place on 13 December 1992. The championship ended on 17 October 1993.

Erin's Own entered the championship as the defending champions.

On 17 October 1993, St. Finbarr's won the championship following a 1-14 to 1-13 defeat of Carbery in a replay of the final. This was their 25th championship title and their first in five championship seasons. It remains their last championship triumph.

Team changes

To Championship

Promoted from the Cork Intermediate Hurling Championship
 Bishopstown

Results

First round

Second round

Quarter-finals

Semi-finals

Final

Championship statistics

Top scorers

Overall

In a single game

Miscellaneous

 Bishopstown make their first appearance in the SHC.

References

Cork Senior Hurling Championship
Cork Senior Hurling Championship